Henric Arvid Bengt Christer Horn af Åminne (12 March 1880 – 6 December 1947) was a Swedish Army officer and horse rider who competed in the 1912 Summer Olympics. He finished tenth in the individual eventing on the horse Omen. Although his team finished first, Horn af Åminne did not receive a gold medal, because only three best members of each team were counted, and he was the fourth.

Horn af Åminne was ryttmästare in the Swedish Army.

References

1880 births
1947 deaths
Swedish Army officers
Olympic equestrians of Sweden
Swedish male equestrians
Equestrians at the 1912 Summer Olympics
Olympic gold medalists for Sweden
Swedish event riders
Olympic medalists in equestrian
Medalists at the 1912 Summer Olympics
Sportspeople from Stockholm